Night Owls is the second studio album by Vaya Con Dios. It was released in 1990.

Track listing

Personnel
André Brasseur – Hammond organ
Bruno Castellucci – drums
Steve Clisby – background vocals
Verona Davis – background vocals
Jason Johnson – background vocals
Dani Klein – vocals
Eric Melaerts – acoustic guitar
Patrick Mortier – trumpet, flugelhorn
Dirk Schoufs – bass guitar, arranger, producer
Frank Wuyts – piano

Charts

Weekly charts

Year-end charts

Certifications and sales

References

External links
Night Owls at Discogs
Album Night Owls at Eurosong.ru

1990 albums
Vaya Con Dios (band) albums
Ariola Records albums